Allokoenenia is a genus of Eukoeneniid microwhip scorpions, first described by Filippo Silvestri in 1913.

Species 
, the World Palpigradi Catalog accepts the following three species:

 Allokoenenia afra Silvestri, 1913 – Guinea
 Allokoenenia canhembora Souza & Ferreira, 2022 – Brazil
 Allokoenenia stygia Souza & Ferreira, 2022 – Brazil

References 

Arachnids of Africa
Arthropods of Guinea
Palpigradi
Taxa named by Filippo Silvestri